This is a list of mosques in Scandinavia. This includes the Scandinavian countries of Denmark, Norway and Sweden.

Denmark

Norway

Sweden

See also
Islam in Denmark
Islam in Finland
Islam in Norway
Islam in Sweden

References

 
Scandinavia
Mosques